The 2013 European Shooting Championships (25, 50, 300 m) were held in Osijek, Croatia from 21 July – 4 August 2013.

Men's events

Pistol

Rifle

300 m rifle

Women's events

Pistol

Rifle

300 m rifle

Men's Junior events

Women's Junior events

Medal summary

Seniors

Juniors

References

External links
 Official Website
 Results

European Shooting Championships
European Shooting Championships
2013 European Shooting Championships
European Shooting Championships
Sport in Osijek
Shooting competitions in Croatia